Hełm (Polish for "Helmet") is a Polish coat of arms. It was used by a number of szlachta (noble) families under the Polish–Lithuanian Commonwealth.

History

Blazon

Notable bearers
Notable bearers of this coat of arms have included:

External links 
  Helm Coat of Arms and the bearers.

See also
 Polish heraldry
 Heraldry
 Coat of arms
 List of Polish nobility coats of arms 
 Hełm coat of arms

Sources
 Dynastic Genealogy 
 Ornatowski.com 

Polish coats of arms